South Wind is a 2018 Serbian crime film directed by Miloš Avramović. 

A sequel, South Wind: Acceleration, was released on November 4, 2021.

Plot

Cast
Miloš Biković - Petar Maraš
Nebojša Glogovac - Golub
Dragan Bjelogrlić - Dragoslav „Car”
Miloš Timotijević - Stupar
 - Baća
Srđan Todorović - Jani
Jovana Stojiljković - Sofija
Jasna Đuričić - Anđela Maraš
Aleksandar Berček - Crveni (Red)

Adaptations
A TV series based on the film was announced in 2019 and premiered on January 19 2020. A second season was announced the same year but is currently on hold due to the COVID-19 pandemic.

Soundtrack

Track listing

References

External links 
 

Serbian crime films
2018 crime action films
Films set in Belgrade 
Films about the Serbian Mafia
2010s vigilante films
Gangster films
Films about revenge
Films shot in Belgrade
Works about organized crime in Serbia
Films set in Bulgaria